The Lagginhorn (4,010 m) is a mountain in the Pennine Alps in Switzerland. It lies a few kilometres north of the slightly higher Weissmies and also close to the slightly lower Fletschhorn on the north.

The Lagginhorn is the last four-thousander in the main chain before the Simplon Pass; it is also the lowest four-thousander in Switzerland.

The first ascent was by Edward Levi Ames and three other Englishmen, together with  local Saas Grund clergyman Johann Josef Imseng, Franz Andenmatten and three other guides on 26 August 1856.

Climbing routes
The Lagginhorn is characterised by rock climbing rather than snow climbs and possesses a lengthy scramble along the South Ridge including one or more exposed abseils:
West-South-West Ridge, PD
South Ridge, AD, III
West-South-West Rib and South Ridge, AD
North-North-East Ridge (via Fletschhorn), PD+

Huts
 Weissmies Hut (2,726 m)
 Berghaus Hohsaas (3,100 m)
 Laggin Bivouac (2,425 m)

See also

List of 4000 metre peaks of the Alps

References

Bibliography 
 Dumler, Helmut and Willi P. Burkhardt, The High Mountains of the Alps, London: Diadem, 1994

External links

 The Lagginhorn on SummitPost
 Route description from Weissmies Hut to Lagginhorn summit

Alpine four-thousanders
Mountains of the Alps
Mountains of Valais
Pennine Alps
Mountains of Switzerland
Four-thousanders of Switzerland